A Home Energy Rating is an estimated measurement of a home's energy efficiency based on normalized modified end-use loads (nMEULs). In the United States, the Residential Energy Services Network (RESNET) is responsible for creation and maintenance of the RESNET Mortgage Industry National Home Energy Rating Standards (MINHERS), a proprietary system of standards,  which includes standards language for the certification and quality assurance on RESNET Provider organizations. They also manage standards in compliance with the American National Standards Institute, namely ANSI 301, ANSI 310, ANSI 380, and ANSI 850. The Building Science Institute, Ltd. Co. (BSI) is another quality management organization that relies on the ANSI Standards to produce Energy Ratings and compliance with above-code programs such as the ENERGY STAR New Homes Program.

Home energy ratings can be used for either existing homes or new homes.  A home energy rating of an existing home allows a homeowner to receive a report listing options for upgrading a home's energy efficiency.  The homeowners may then use the report to determine the most effective ways in which to upgrade the home's energy efficiency.  A home energy rating of a new home allows buyers to compare the energy efficiency of homes they are considering buying.

Usage

A home energy rating can be used to estimate the energy efficiency of a home compared to a reference home built to the 2006 IECC Standards or estimate the efficiency of a home that is being constructed or improved.  A home energy rating of a home prior to construction or improvement is called a “projected rating”. A home energy rating that is used to determine a home's as-built estimated energy efficiency is referred to as a “confirmed rating". A home energy rating that is generated through an accepted sampling procedure is called a "sampled rating". A home energy rating that receives verification for all required minimum rated features but relies on threshold values for tested features is called a "threshold rating".

Energy assessments take into account different climatic conditions in different parts of the country and are benchmarked according to average household energy consumption particular to a given climatic region.

Energy Rating Index (ERI) and related scales

Ratings provide a relative energy use index called the Energy Rating Index. An Index of 100 represents the estimated energy performance equivalent to a home built to the 2006 IECC standards and an Index of 0 (zero) indicates that the building uses no net purchased energy (a Zero Energy Building). The lower the value, the better. 
 
For capitalizing a building's energy performance in the mortgage loan, certification of “White Tags” for private financial investors, and by the US government for verification of building energy performance for such programs as federal tax incentives, the United States Environmental Protection Agency’s Energy Star program and the U.S. Department of Energy’s Building America Program.

Derivative calculations include the RESNET-proprietary HERStm Index, which is modified by RESNET's MINHERS Standards. RESNET has publicly stated that the HERS Index modifies the ANSI Standards for their proprietary HERS Ratings.

Additional ERI variants are modified by different iterations of the International Code Council (ICC) energy code. Typically differences include changes to mechanical ventilation.

The HERS Index replaced the earlier "HERS Score", which ran in the opposite direction: The higher the value, the better. In 2009, the U.S. Department of Energy presented a new scale, the "EnergySmart Home Scale (E-Scale)", "based on" the HERS Index, apparently simply by subtracting the HERS Index from 100. In this new scale, higher values correspond again to better performance.

As of March 2022, a Carbon Index measurement has been added to ANSI 301-2019 through Addendum D-2022.

Projected and Confirmed Ratings
Projected ratings give home owners and builders an estimate of what a home's estimated efficiency will be like after construction or improvements, so that they may determine the most cost-effective route to improve a building's efficiency. 
A confirmed rating, which indicates the home's as-built estimated efficiency, requires an inspection of the home from an energy rater.  The energy rater reviews the home to identify its energy characteristics, such as insulation levels, window efficiency, wall-to-window ratios, the heating and cooling system efficiency, the solar orientation of the home, and the water heating system. Performance testing, such as a blower door test for air leakage and duct leakage, is usually part of the rating.

Confirmed, Sampled, and Threshold Ratings are registered with public databases such as the RESNET Registry and the BSI Registry. Some confirmed ratings also extend an economic guarantee on energy usage.

Types of Verifiers
In order to provide certified Energy Ratings to rating clients such as builders or homeowners, individuals must become a Certified Rater through an Approved Rating Provider. 

Under RESNET's MINHERS, the process of becoming a Certified HERS Rater includes the following:

 Training: HERS Rater candidates shall attend a HERS Rater training course presented by a RESNET-accredited Training Provider, either in-person or through self paced online programs. Upon completion of the HERS Rater training course, candidates must pass the RESNET Standard Rater exam, the RESCAZ Simulation Exam, and the RESNET Rater Simulation Practical Examination. The tests are open book and open note.
 Mentorship: After successful completion of the HERS Rater training course and three exams, the candidate must sign a contract with a RESNET Rating Provider in order to be mentored through five Probationary ratings. The Probationary Rater shall complete these ratings under the supervision and direction of the Provider. Upon successful completion of all three Probationary ratings, and any other requirements outlined by the Provider, the individual will become a Certified HERS Rater.
 Certification and Professional Development: HERS Raters must maintain their certification by obtaining 18 RESNET-approved Professional Development Hours (PDHs) in a 3 year period. PDHs may be earned by attending individual training sessions offered by RESNET Training Providers or attending the RESNET Building Performance Conference.
Under BSI's Building Science Education Training & Certification System Process 02, prior to credentialing, candidates must successfully complete the following:

 Training programs through Building Science Education: ICC-approved Plans Examiner/Energy Code Inspector, ANSI/RESNET/ICC 301-2019, ANSI/RESNET/ICC 380-2019, ANSI/RESNET/ACCA 310-2020, ANSI/ACCA 12-2018, Energy Modeling, and HouseRater training (approximately 80+ hours of training). Upon completion of the ICC Plans Examiner/Energy Code Inspector training, candidates must pass the ICC-proctored Plans Examiner/Energy Code Inspector Exam.
 Mentorship: 10 energy models of different dwelling unit types, 5 pre-drywall / insulation verifications, and 5 final verifications. All of these must be completed under the mentorship of BSI-credentialed Quality Assessors or Quality Assessment Designees
 Professional Development: All individuals credentialed by the Building Science Institute must complete 6 hours of continuing education per calendar year to maintain their credential.Both organizations have additional certification levels to perform solely field inspection or energy modeling duties. 
Please note, some States (such as Texas) have additional requirements for individuals who perform code compliance activities. This includes additional certification(s) from the International Code Council and related organizations, which the HERS Rater certification does not comply with. In order to participate in above-code programs like the ENERGY STAR Program, Certified Raters through RESNET or BSI must complete additional training and exams.

Quality Management of Energy Ratings
Energy Ratings are required to receive quality oversight from approved providers, such as RESNET and BSI.

RESNET's MINHERS grants the authority of individual companies, called Rating Providers or QA Providers to offer this oversight internally or with 3rd parties. These organizations are required to have RESNET-certified Quality Assurance Designees contracted or on staff to perform a minimum of 10% review of rating files (energy models) submitted for certification by a Rater annually. Additionally, QA Providers must perform on-site field QA on 1% of ratings submitted by a Rater annually. RESNET requires these QA Providers submit annual packages verifying their QA work complies with RESNET standards, which are reviewed by RESNET Staff members. On an annual basis, RESNET also performs field quality assurance audits on 25% of QA Providers, and 50% of QA Providers receive a file quality assurance audit.

BSI performs quality management oversight activities through automated activities in HouseRater, manual review of all projects submitted prior to registration, and annual organization reviews according to American Society for Quality (ASQ) guidelines. Verification Organizations contracted through BSI can perform quality management internally, provided the Quality Assessors are properly credentialed by BSI and do not conflict with the Structural Requirements for Verification Organizations.

See also

References

Building energy rating